St. Vladimir’s Orthodox Theological Seminary (SVOTS) is an Eastern Orthodox seminary in Yonkers, New York. It is chartered under the State University of New York and accredited by the Association of Theological Schools. It is a pan-Eastern Orthodox institution associated with the Orthodox Church in America (OCA).

History
The seminary was founded in 1938. It moved to its current location in 1962. Four years later, it was accepted as an associate member in the American Association of Theological Schools with accreditation following in 1973.

Presidents 

 Archpriest Chad Hatfield

Deans
 Bishop Macarius (Ilyinsky), 1938 - 1944
 Archimandrite Dionysius (Diachenko), 1944 - 1947
 Bishop John (Shahovskoy), 1947 - 1950
 Protopresbyter Georges Florovsky, 1950 - 1955
 Metropolitan Leontius (Turkevich), 1955 - 1962
 Protopresbyter Alexander Schmemann, 1962 - 1983
 Protopresbyter John Meyendorff, 1984 - 1992
 Protopresbyter Thomas Hopko, 1992 - 2002
 Archpriest John H. Erickson, 2002 - 2007
 Archpriest John Behr, 2007 - 2017 (Last dean under previous governance structure)
 Ionut-Alexandru Tudorie, 2018 - Present (First academic dean under new governance structure)

Academics
St. Vladimir's Seminary is accredited by the Association of Theological Schools (ATS) and approved by ATS to grant the following degrees: Master of Divinity (M.Div.), Master of Arts (MA), Master of Theology (Th.M.), and Doctor of Ministry (D.Min).

St. Vladimir’s Seminary Press (SVS Press) 
St. Vladimir's Seminary Press was founded in 1962 and is the largest publisher of Orthodox Christian books in the English language.

Among their titles is their Popular Patristics Series.

References

External links
Official website

Eastern Orthodox seminaries
Seminaries and theological colleges in New York (state)
Orthodox Church in America
Education in Yonkers, New York
Educational institutions established in 1938
Eastern Orthodox churches in the United States
Eastern Orthodoxy in New York (state)
1938 establishments in New York (state)
Vladimir the Great